Romance and Rustlers is a 1925 American silent Western film directed by Ben F. Wilson and starring Yakima Canutt, Dorothy Wood and Joseph W. Girard.

Cast
 Yakima Canutt as Bud Kane
 Dorothy Wood as Ruth Larrabee
 Harris Gordon as George Wallace
 Joseph W. Girard as John Larrabee

References

Bibliography
 Connelly, Robert B. The Silents: Silent Feature Films, 1910-36, Volume 40, Issue 2. December Press, 1998.
 Langman, Larry. A Guide to Silent Westerns. Greenwood Publishing Group, 1992.
 Munden, Kenneth White. The American Film Institute Catalog of Motion Pictures Produced in the United States, Part 1. University of California Press, 1997.

External links
 

1925 films
1925 Western (genre) films
1920s English-language films
American silent feature films
Silent American Western (genre) films
American black-and-white films
Films directed by Ben F. Wilson
Arrow Film Corporation films
1920s American films